The Dukes of Hazzard is an American action comedy TV series that was aired on CBS from January 26, 1979 to February 8, 1985. The show aired for 147 episodes spanning seven seasons. It was consistently among the top-rated television series in the late 1970s (at one point, ranking second only to Dallas, which immediately followed the show on CBS's Friday night schedule). The show is about two young male cousins, Bo and Luke Duke, who live in rural Georgia and are on probation for moonshine-running. The young men and their friends and their female cousin Daisy Duke, and other family (such as patriarch Uncle Jesse), have various escapades as they evade the corrupt county commissioner Boss Hogg and law officer Sheriff Rosco P. Coltrane. The young men drive a customized 1969 Dodge Charger nicknamed the General Lee, which became a symbol of the show.

The series was inspired by the 1975 film Moonrunners, about a bootlegger family which was also created by Gy Waldron and had many identical or similar character names and concepts. The show was the basis for a film of the same title in 2005.

Plot overview
The Dukes of Hazzard follows the adventures of "the Duke boys", cousins Bo Duke (John Schneider) and Luke Duke (Tom Wopat) (including Coy and Vance Duke for most of season 5), who live on a family farm in fictional Hazzard County, Georgia (the exact location of which was never specified, though Atlanta was mentioned several times as the nearest big city), with their female cousin Daisy (Catherine Bach) and their wise old Uncle Jesse (Denver Pyle). The Duke boys race around in their customized 1969 Dodge Charger stock car, dubbed (The) General Lee, evading crooked and corrupt county commissioner Boss Hogg (Sorrell Booke) and his bumbling and corrupt Sheriff Rosco P. Coltrane (James Best) along with his deputy(s), and always managing to get caught in the middle of various local escapades and incidents.

Bo and Luke were previously sentenced to probation for illegal transportation of moonshine; their Uncle Jesse made a plea bargain with the U.S. Government to refrain from distilling moonshine in exchange for Bo and Luke's freedom. As a result, Bo and Luke are on five years' probation and not allowed to carry instead, they often use compound bows, sometimes with arrows tipped with or to leave Hazzard County unless they get probation permission from their probation officer, Boss Hogg. The exact details of their probation terms vary from episode to episode. Sometimes it is implied that they would be jailed for merely crossing the county line; on other occasions, it is shown that they may leave Hazzard, as long as they are back within a certain time limit. Several other technicalities of their probation also come into play at various times.

Corrupt county commissioner Jefferson Davis (J. D.) "Boss" Hogg either runs, or has his fingers in, virtually everything in Hazzard County. Hogg is forever angry with the Dukes, especially Bo and Luke due to their habit of foiling his crooked schemes. Many episodes revolve around Hogg's attempts to engage in some such scheme, sometimes with the aid of hired criminal help.

Some of these are get-rich-quick schemes, though many others affect the financial security of the Duke farm, which Hogg has long wanted to acquire for various reasons. Other times, Hogg hires criminals from out of town to do his dirty work for him, and he often tries to frame Bo and Luke as part of these plots. Bo and Luke always seem to stumble over Hogg's latest scheme, sometimes by curiosity, and often by sheer luck, and put it out of business. Despite the Dukes often coming to his rescue, Hogg never loses his irrational dislike of the clan, particularly Bo and Luke, often accusing them of spying on him, robbing or planning to rob him, or other nefarious actions.

The role of Boss Hogg was played by Sorrell Booke, who performed frequently on radio, stage, and film prior to his role in The Dukes of Hazzard. Boss Hogg is one of only two characters to appear in every episode of the series, the other being Uncle Jesse Duke.

The other main characters of the show include local mechanic Cooter Davenport (Ben Jones), who in early episodes was portrayed as a wild, unshaven rebel, often breaking or treading on the edge of the law, before settling down to become the Duke family's best friend (he is often referred to as an "honorary Duke") and owning the local garage. Enos Strate (Sonny Shroyer) is an honest, but naive young deputy who, despite his friendship with the Dukes (and his crush on Daisy), is reluctantly forced to take part in Hogg and Rosco's crooked schemes. In the third and fourth seasons, when Shroyer left for his own show, his character was replaced by Deputy Cletus Hogg (Rick Hurst), Boss's cousin, who is slightly more wily than Enos but still a somewhat reluctant player in Hogg's plots.

Owing to their fundamentally good natures, the Dukes often wind up helping Boss Hogg out of trouble, albeit grudgingly. More than once Hogg is targeted by former associates who are either seeking revenge or have double crossed him after a scheme has unraveled in one way or another. Sheriff Coltrane also finds himself targeted in some instances. On such occasions, Bo and Luke usually have to rescue their adversaries as an inevitable precursor to defeating the bad guys; in other instances, the Dukes join forces with Hogg and Coltrane to tackle bigger threats to Hazzard or one of their respective parties. These instances became more frequent as the show progressed, and later seasons saw a number of stories where the Dukes and Hogg (and Coltrane) temporarily work together.

Production

The series was developed from the 1975 film Moonrunners. Created by Gy Waldron in collaboration with ex-moonshiner Jerry Rushing, this movie shares many identical and very similar names and concepts with the subsequent TV series. Although itself essentially a comedy, this original movie was much cruder and edgier than the family-friendly TV series that evolved from it.

In 1977, Waldron was approached by Warner Bros. with the idea of developing Moonrunners into a television series. Waldron reworked various elements from Moonrunners, ultimately devising what became The Dukes of Hazzard. Production began in October 1978 with the original intention of only nine episodes for a mid-season filler. The first five episodes were filmed in Covington and Conyers, Georgia and surrounding areas, including some location work in nearby Atlanta. After completing production on the fifth episode, "High Octane", the cast and crew broke for Christmas break, expecting to return in several weeks to complete the ordered run of episodes. In the meantime, executives at Warner Bros. were impressed by the rough preview cuts of the completed episodes and saw potential in developing the show into a full-running series. Part of this plan was to move production from Georgia to the Warner Bros. lot in Burbank, California, to simplify production as well as develop a larger workshop to service the large number of automobiles needed for the series.

Rushing appeared as shady used car dealer Ace Parker in the third episode, "Repo Men" (the fourth to be broadcast). Rushing believed this to be the start of a recurring role, in return for which he would supply creative ideas from his experiences: many of the Dukes (and thus Moonrunners) characters and situations were derived from Rushing's experiences as a youth, and much of the character of Bo Duke, he states to be based on him. However, "Repo Men" would turn out to be the character's only appearance in the show's run, leading to a legal dispute in the following years over the rights to characters and concepts. Despite this, Rushing remained on good terms with cast and crew and in recent years has made appearances at several fan conventions.

By the end of the first (half) season, the family-friendly tone of The Dukes of Hazzard was mostly in place. When the show returned for a second season in fall 1979 (its first full season), with a few further minor tweaks, it quickly found its footing as a family-friendly comedy-adventure series. By the third season, starting in fall 1980, the template which would be widely associated with the show was evident.

As well as car chases, jumps and stunts, The Dukes of Hazzard relied on character familiarity, with each character effectively serving the same role within a typical episode. Deputy Cletus replaced Deputy Enos in Seasons 3 and 4, and Coy and Vance Duke temporarily replaced Bo and Luke (due to a salary dispute) for most of Season 5, but these were the only major cast changes through the show's run. Only Uncle Jesse and Boss Hogg appeared in all 145 episodes; Daisy appears in all but one, the third season's "To Catch a Duke." The General Lee also appears in all episodes except "Mary Kaye's Baby".

The show was largely filmed in Hidden Valley in Thousand Oaks, California, with scenes also shot at nearby Lake Sherwood and also at Paramount Ranch in nearby Agoura Hills.

Episodes

The show ran for seven seasons and a total of 147 episodes. Many of the episodes followed a similar structure "out-of-town crooks pull a robbery or commit a crime or scandal, Duke boys blamed, spend the rest of the hour clearing their names, the General Lee flies and the squad cars crash".

Cast and characters

Main characters
 Lucas K. "Luke" Duke (Tom Wopat), is the dark-haired, older Duke boy. More mature and rational than his cousin Bo, he is typically the one who thinks of the plan that will get the two out of whatever trouble they have gotten into. Luke wears a checked blue shirt (a plain blue shirt in most, though not all, second-series episodes) and a denim jacket over it in first season and a few later second-season episodes. He is a veteran of the United States Marine Corps and a former boxer. Luke was the first Duke to perform the "hood slide" across the General Lee, which is seen in the opening credits of the show (a shot taken from the second episode, "Daisy's Song"). According to Wopat the slide was an accident, because his foot got caught on the side of the General Lee when he attempted to jump across the hood; he also caught his arm on the hood's radio antenna, resulting in such antennas being removed from later versions of the General Lee. However, the "hood slide" quickly proved popular and became a regular staple of the rest of the episodes. The only episode to directly refer to the age difference between Luke and Bo is in the seventh season opener, the "flashback" episode "Happy Birthday, General Lee", where it is stated that Luke had already been in the Marines while Bo was in his last year at high school. Though Bo and Luke share the CB call sign "Lost Sheep", in the season one episode "Money to Burn", Luke refers to himself (singularly) as "Sittin' Duck".
 Beauregard "Bo" Duke (John Schneider) is the blonde-haired, younger Duke boy. He is more of the "shoot first, ask questions later" type than Luke, and is often the one to get the duo into the various scrapes in which they find themselves, although the character did mature slightly as the series progressed. In the first-season episode "High Octane", his actual first name is revealed to be Beauregard (as in Confederate General Pierre Beauregard). Bo is also more likely to have his eye, or heart, distracted by a pretty girl. Bo has a crush on many women in some episodes, which proves to be the Achilles' heel that leads the Dukes into trouble in several episode plots. Bo usually wears a cream-yellow shirt; for the first two seasons he wears a blue T-shirt underneath (brown in the first episode). This was slowly phased out during the third season. An ex-stock car driver, Bo is the one who drives the General Lee most of the time, with Luke riding shotgun. He and Luke take turns of driving the General Lee in some episodes as they share the car with each other (very early episodes suggest that it belongs solely to him; Luke is said to have a car that Cooter had wrecked shortly prior to the start of the opening episode, "One Armed Bandits"). Bo is known for his rebel yell, "Yeeeee-haaa," which he usually yells when the General Lee is airborne during a jump. The Duke boys share the CB call sign or handle "Lost Sheep".
 Daisy Duke (Catherine Bach) is Bo, Luke, Coy, and Vance's cousin. She is beautiful, honest, and kind, although she can sometimes be slightly over-trusting and naïve, which has led the Duke family into trouble on a number of occasions. She sometimes aspires to be a songwriter and singer, and at other times, a reporter. She races around Hazzard with her cousins, first in a yellow and black 1974 Plymouth Road Runner (later a 1971 Plymouth Satellite was used) and then, from mid-season 2 on, in her trademark white 1980 Jeep CJ-7, christened Dixie with a golden eagle emblem on the hood (and the name "Dixie" on the hood sides). Daisy works as a waitress at the Boar's Nest, the local bar and pub owned by Boss Hogg, as part of an agreement with Boss Hogg so that he would give Uncle Jesse and the boys a loan for a lower interest rate so the boys could purchase the entry fee for a race in which they wished to race the General Lee. The arrangement was supposed to be for an indefinite time, but there are several times throughout the series when Hogg fires her. However, he always ends up rehiring her at the end of each episode because of various circumstances. Although Hogg is a nemesis to Daisy and her family, she is friends with Hogg's wife Lulu. Daisy often uses her charming personality and sex appeal to influence male policemen or henchmen into going easier on other Duke family members and/or cause them to become too distracted to carry out their assigned duties or evil plans.  Daisy also utilizes her position at the restaurant to get insider information to help the Dukes in foiling Hogg's various schemes. She also has the distinction of having her trademark provocatively high-cut jean short shorts named after her: "daisy dukes". Her CB handle is "Bo Peep". Occasionally, the variant of "Country Cousin" is used.
 Jesse Duke (Denver Pyle), referred to by just about everyone in Hazzard other than Boss Hogg as "Uncle Jesse", is the patriarch of the Duke clan, and the father figure to all of the Dukes who stay with him on the Duke farm. Jesse apparently has at least five siblings but no children of his own, and he happily provides for his nephews and niece in the unexplained absence of all of their parents (Gy Waldron, the creator of the show, states on the DVDs that their parents were killed in a car wreck, but it was never mentioned in the show). In the third broadcast episode, "Mary Kaye's Baby", Jesse says that he has delivered many babies, including Bo and Luke. Jesse Duke, in his youth, had been a ridgerunner in direct competition with Boss Hogg, whom he always calls "J.D.". However, while both Boss Hogg and Uncle Jesse would scowl at the mention of the other's name, the two enjoyed a lifelong "friendship" of sorts, with one helping the other when in desperate need. Jesse educated his nephews against Hogg, and often provides the cousins with inspirational sage advice. Uncle Jesse drives a white 1973 Ford F-100 pickup truck. In the barn, he also has his old moonshine-running car, called Sweet Tillie in its first appearance (in the first-season episode "High Octane"), but referred to as Black Tillie in subsequent appearances. In the second-season episode "Follow That Still" and the sixth-season episode "The Boar's Nest Bears", the marriage to, and death of, his wife is mentioned; he also mentions marrying her in the first-season episode "Luke's Love Story". His CB handle is "Shepherd", a reference to his always seeking out and saving his "lost sheep"—Bo and Luke—from their various irresponsible mishaps.
 Sheriff Rosco P. Coltrane (James Best) is the bumbling and corrupt sheriff of Hazzard County and right-hand man and brother-in-law of its corrupt county administrator, Jefferson Davis "J.D." Hogg ("Boss Hogg"), whom Rosco calls his "little fat buddy", "Little Chrome Dome", "Little Meadow-Muffin", and several other names. In the early episodes, it is mentioned that Rosco spent the first 20 years of his career as a mostly honest lawman, but after the county voted away his pension, Rosco joined Hogg in an effort to fund his retirement in his last couple of years as sheriff. Early episodes also portray him as a fairly hard-nosed, somewhat darker policeman character, who even shoots a criminal during the first season. As the series progressed and producers recognized how popular it had become with children, Best altered his portrayal into a more bumbling, comical character. By the end of the first season, his origin had been virtually forgotten (and his job as sheriff appeared to become open-ended). Rosco is also the younger brother of Lulu Coltrane Hogg (Boss Hogg's wife). Rosco frequently initiates car chases with Bo and Luke Duke, but the Duke boys usually elude Rosco by outwitting him, with Rosco typically wrecking his patrol car as a result from which he would nearly always escape unscathed (only two episodes—the fourth season's "Coltrane vs. Duke" and the sixth season's "Too Many Roscos"—toy with the concept of him being injured. The first episode has him faking injury so that the Duke boys would lose the General Lee while the latter has Best playing two characters. His normal character, Rosco, is presumed drowned while a criminal that looks like Rosco has a headache). These chases are often the result of Rosco setting up illegal speed traps such as false or changing speed limit signs and various other trickery, which would evolve into being increasingly more cartoonish and far-fetched as the seasons passed. While he enjoys "hot pursuit" he seemingly (Boss Hogg as well) never intends for anyone to get seriously hurt. His middle initial, "P", was added at the start of the second season, and only one episode (the third season's "Mrs. Rosco P. Coltrane", in which he is subjected to a scam marriage) reveals his middle name, "Purvis". Rosco also has a soft spot for his Basset Hound Flash, introduced at the start of the third season. His radio codename is "Red Dog". When Best briefly boycotted the show during the mid-second season, he was temporarily replaced by several "one-off" sheriffs, the longest standing being Sheriff Grady Bird, played by Dick Sargent, who appeared in two episodes ("Jude Emery" and "Officer Daisy Duke").
 Boss Jefferson Davis "J.D." Hogg (Sorrell Booke) is the wealthiest man in Hazzard County and owns most of its property and businesses—whether directly or by holding the mortgages over the land. Usually dressed in an all-white suit, he is the fat, greedy, corrupt county commissioner with visions of grandeur and a voracious appetite for food, who constantly orders Rosco to "Get them Duke boys!" He is also Bo and Luke's probation officer; when Bo and Luke need to leave Hazzard they always get permission from him. Boss Hogg is also married to (and dominated by) Rosco's "fat sister" (Lulu Coltrane Hogg), a point that does not always sit well with either Boss Hogg or Rosco; Hogg sometimes claims that Rosco is indebted to him because of it, though his on-screen interactions with Lulu typically show him loving her deeply (and giving in to her stronger personality). In addition to his role as county commissioner, he is also the police commissioner, land commissioner, and bank president. Boss is also the chief of the Hazzard Fire Department and the owner of, or primary mortgage holder on, most of the places in the county, including the Boar's Nest, Rhubottem's Store, Cooter's garage and the Duke farm. It is implied in some episodes that he is the Justice of the Peace, but in others Hazzard relies on a circuit judge. In the episode "Coltrane vs. Duke", Hogg represents Rosco when he sues the Dukes, implying that he is a licensed attorney. His vehicle is a white 1970 Cadillac Coupe de Ville convertible, with bull horns mounted on the hood. In the first few seasons, he is almost always driven around by a chauffeur. His old moonshine-running car was called The Gray Ghost. Every morning, Boss Hogg would drink coffee and eat raw liver (Booke, a method actor, actually ate the raw liver). Boss Hogg is described in one analysis as "an ineffectual bad guy—hence amusing".
 Cooter Davenport (Ben Jones) is the Hazzard County mechanic, nicknamed "Crazy Cooter" (a "cooter" is a large freshwater turtle, common in the southeastern U.S.). In the early episodes, he is a wild man, often breaking the law. By the end of the first season, he has settled down and become an easygoing good ol' boy. Although not mentioned in the first couple of episodes, by the mid-first season, he owns "Cooter's Garage" in Hazzard County Square, directly across from the Sheriff's Department. Cooter is an "honorary Duke", as he shares the same values and often assists the Dukes in escaping Rosco's clutches, or helps them to foil Boss Hogg's schemes. During the second season, Jones left the series for a few episodes due to a dispute over whether the character should be clean-shaven or have a full beard. In his absence, Cooter's place was filled by several of Cooter's supposed cousins who were never mentioned before or since. Jones returned when the dispute was solved—Cooter would be clean-shaven (although, for continuity reasons, with the episodes being broadcast in a different order to that which they were filmed, he was not clean-shaven until the third season onwards). Cooter drives a variety of trucks, including Fords, Chevys, and GMCs. His CB handle is "Crazy Cooter" and he often starts his CB transmissions with "Breaker one, Breaker one, I might be crazy but I ain't dumb, Craaaazy Cooter comin' atcha, come on."
 Deputy Enos Strate (Sonny Shroyer) is a friend of the Dukes but, while working for Rosco and Boss, he is often forced into pursuing the Dukes and/or arresting them on trumped-up charges. In the early episodes, Enos is shown to be a rather good driver (and respected as such by Bo and Luke) but, by the end of the first season, he is shown to be as incompetent a driver as Rosco. His common catchphrase is "Possum on a gumbush!" When he returns from his stint in Los Angeles, he seems to be able to stand up to Boss and Rosco slightly more, and sometimes refuses to participate in their schemes. In the early episodes, Rosco frequently calls him "jackass", which soon evolved into the more family-friendly "dipstick" as the show became a hit with younger viewers (though Boss Hogg, who would also use the term "jackass" of Sheriff Rosco, would occasionally return to calling Enos this in later seasons). Enos has a crush on Daisy Duke that she often uses to the Dukes' advantage in unraveling Hogg and Rosco's schemes. Enos is very much in love with Daisy, and although Daisy seems to love him back, it is supposedly only as a close friend. In the penultimate episode, "Enos and Daisy's Wedding", the two plan on getting married, only to have Enos call it off at the last minute due to an attack of hives, brought on by the excitement of possibly being married to Daisy. Later, in the first reunion movie, Enos and Daisy become a pair again and plan to get married, but this time Daisy backs out at the last minute upon the unexpected sight of her ex-husband.
 Deputy Cletus Hogg (Rick Hurst), Boss Hogg's second cousin twice removed, is generally friendly and dim-witted. Like Enos, Cletus is often forced by Rosco and Hogg to chase the Dukes on trumped up charges. While Cletus is good-hearted, and sometimes resentful of having to treat the Dukes in such a way, he is somewhat more willing to go along with Hogg and Rosco than Enos. Cletus has a crush (though not as bad as Enos' crush) on Daisy and is even convinced she wants to marry him. Like Enos and Rosco, Cletus frequently ends up landing in a pond when pursuing the Duke boys in a car chase. Cletus makes his first appearance as the driver of a bank truck, part of Hogg's latest get-rich-quick scheme, in the first-season episode "Money To Burn", and becomes temporary deputy while Enos is away in the second-season episodes "The Meeting" and "Road Pirates". Leaving a job at the local junkyard, he becomes permanent deputy in the third season's "Enos Strate to the Top". After Enos' return, the pair both serve as deputies and share the same patrol car until 1997's reunion movie. Each of the Hazzard County Sheriff's Department officers drives various mid- to late-1970s Chrysler mid-size B body patrol cars, most often a Dodge Monaco or Plymouth Fury.
 Coy Duke (Byron Cherry) is another blonde-haired cousin who moves to Uncle Jesse's farm along with his cousin Vance after Bo and Luke left Hazzard to join the NASCAR circuit in season 5. Like his cousin Bo, he often drives the General Lee, is a bit wilder than Vance and chases women; he and Vance are only in the first 19 episodes of season 5 and Coy and Vance are in only one episode with their cousins Bo and Luke when they return from the NASCAR circuit. Supposedly, with cousin Vance, Coy had previously lived on the Duke farm until 1976, before the series had started.
 Vance Duke (Christopher Mayer), an obvious replacement for Luke, filled the void of a dark-haired Duke on the show. Like Luke, Vance is more the thinker and the planner of the duo, along with being more mature than Coy. He is also a former Merchant Mariner.
 The Balladeer (voice of Waylon Jennings) sings and plays the Dukes of Hazzard theme song, "Good Ol' Boys", and also serves as the show's narrator. During each episode, he provides an omniscient viewpoint of the situations presented, and regularly interjects comical asides during crucial plot points (often, during a freeze frame of a cliffhanger scene right before a commercial break) and "down home" aphorisms (these freeze-frame cliffhangers were often abridged in showings in some countries, such as the commercial-free BBC in the United Kingdom). After numerous requests from fans to see the Balladeer on-screen, Jennings finally appeared in one episode, the seventh season's aptly titled "Welcome, Waylon Jennings", in which he was presented as an old friend of the Dukes.
 Flash (Sandy and others) is a slow-paced Basset Hound and Rosco's loyal companion, who hates Boss Hogg but loves the Dukes. She first appeared in the first official third-season episode "Enos Strate to the Top" (the two-part third season opener "Carnival of Thrills" was held over from the previous season), although the dog was not formally "introduced" in that episode. Initially referred to as a boy, Flash is later regularly a girl (despite an occasional male reference afterwards). Flash was added at the start of the third season, after James Best suggested to the producers that Rosco have a dog. Rosco doted on Flash, often calling her "Velvet Ears". Flash was portrayed by several Basset Hounds during the series (distinguishable by different facial colors), the most regular being Sandy. James Best bought a share of Sandy, who was rescued from an animal shelter and was trained by Alvin Mears of Alvin Animal Rentals. Sandy lived to age 14. A stuffed dog named Flush was used for dangerous stunt work in a few episodes.

The pilot episode was to include a barber modeled after Floyd Lawson on The Andy Griffith Show as a regular character, but was eliminated when the final draft of the pilot's script was written and before the show was cast.

When John Schneider auditioned for the role of Bo Duke, he came to the audition in a dilapidated pickup truck, sporting a week-long beard growth, wearing overalls and a white T-shirt with a pack of cigarettes rolled up in a sleeve collar, and carrying a can of beer, trying to look the part. At the audition, Schneider drank the beer and said he was from Snellville. The producers bought his "good ol' boy" act and Schneider was hired on the spot.

Recurring characters

Notable guest appearances
Throughout its network television run, The Dukes of Hazzard had a consistent mix of up-and-comers and established stars make guest appearances.

 Robert Alda
 Carlos Brown/Alan Autry
 Anthony De Longis
 James Avery
 Norman Alden
 Rayford Barnes
 Pat Buttram
 Dennis Burkley
 Clancy Brown
 Regis Cordic
 Charles Cyphers
 Roz Kelly
 Ji-Tu Cumbuka
 Ben Davidson
 Elinor Donahue
 Jason Evers
 Jonathan Frakes
 Janie Fricke
 Michael Fairman
 David Gale
 David Graf
 Joy Garrett
 M. C. Gainey
 Henry Gibson
 Burton Gilliam
 Linda Hart
 Dennis Haskins
 Ernie Hudson
 Kevin Peter Hall
 Waylon Jennings
 Stepfanie Kramer
 Lance LeGault
 Loretta Lynn
 Britt Leach
 Jon Locke
 Brion James
 Arte Johnson
 L. Q. Jones
 Frank Marth
 Robin Mattson
 John Matuszak
 Donald May
 Gerald McRaney
 Louise Minchin
 Richard Moll
 Chris Mulkey
 Charles Napier
 Tim O'Connor
 Roy Orbison
 Johnny Paycheck
 Kim Richards
 Hari Rhodes
 Roger Robinson
 Dick Sargent
 Ronnie Schell
 Avery Schreiber
 Judson Scott
 William Smith
 Don Stroud
 Les Tremayne
 Mel Tillis
 Mary Treen
 Lurene Tuttle
 Lewis Van Bergen
 Joseph Whipp
 Dottie West
 Hal Williams
 Steven Williams
 Terry Wilson (final role)
 Morgan Woodward
 Tammy Wynette
 Cale Yarborough

Others
NASCAR driver Terry Labonte makes a brief, uncredited appearance as a crewman in the episode "Undercover Dukes Part 1". The race cars supplied for both "Part 1" and "Part 2" of "Undercover Dukes" were supplied by Labonte's race owner, Billy Hagan. However, the emblems of the sponsors of the cars (at that time Labonte was sponsored by Budweiser) were covered to avoid paying royalties.

The celebrity speed trap
During the show's second season, the show's writers began incorporating a "celebrity speed trap" into some of the episodes, as a means to feature top country stars of the day performing their hits. On its first couple of instances, the "speed trap" was featured early in the story, but for most of the cases, it was featured in the last few minutes of an episode, often used when the main story was running too short to fill episode time.

The "celebrity speed trap" feature was essentially the same each time: Aware that a big-name country star was passing through the area, Boss Hogg would order Rosco to lower the speed limit on a particular road to an unreasonable level (using a reversible sign, with one speed limit on one side and another, far lower, on the back), so that the targeted singer would be in violation of the posted limit. The singer would be required to give a free performance at the Boar's Nest in exchange for having their citations forgiven; the performer would then perform one of their best-known hits or other popular country music standard, while the Dukes, Boss, Rosco, Enos, Cletus, Cooter, and other patrons whooped and hollered in enjoyment of the performance. More often than not, the performer would give a sarcastic parting shot to Boss and Rosco.

Singers who were featured in the "speed trap" segments were:

 Hoyt Axton
 Donna Fargo
 Freddy Fender
 Doug Kershaw (on the original soundtrack)
 The Oak Ridge Boys (twice)
 Roy Orbison
 Buck Owens
 Johnny Paycheck (lip-syncing an original recording)
 Mel Tillis
 Dottie West
 Tammy Wynette
 Waylon Jennings (the show's narrator)

Honorable mentions: Mickey Gilley, Loretta Lynn

Gilley's and Lynn's appearances were not solely for the celebrity speed trap. After performing a concert in Hazzard, Gilley was nabbed while leaving and forced to do a second show to nullify his citation. Loretta Lynn was kidnapped by criminals wanting to break into the music business. Lynn was the very first country music guest star on the show in 1979 and had an entire episode dedicated to her, titled "Find Loretta Lynn".

Janie Fricke was the only country music guest star who did not perform a song, celebrity speed trap or otherwise. She played an accomplice to a robber who hid money in the dashboard of the car that was to become the General Lee.

Casting of Coy and Vance

The Dukes of Hazzard was consistently among the top-rated television series (at one point, ranking second only to Dallas, which immediately followed the show on CBS' Friday night schedule). With that success came huge profits in merchandising, with a wide array of Dukes of Hazzard toys and products being licensed and becoming big sellers. However, over the course of the show's fourth season, series stars Tom Wopat and John Schneider—who had already previously voiced their concern and discontent about increasingly inferior scripts being written for episodes—became increasingly concerned about a contract dispute over their salaries and merchandising royalties owed to them from the high sales of Dukes products. They felt that neither of them was being paid what was owed to them and this became very frustrating to the duo. As a result, in the spring of 1982, as filming was due to begin on the fifth season, Wopat and Schneider did not report to the set in protest over the matter. Catherine Bach also considered walking out due to similar concerns, but Wopat and Schneider convinced her to stay, insisting that if she left, there might not be a show to come back to, and that settling the issue was up to them.

Production was pushed back by a few weeks as fairly similar looking replacements were hastily hired: Byron Cherry as Coy Duke and Christopher Mayer as Vance Duke. Bo and Luke were said to have gone to race on the NASCAR circuit; how they managed to do this, bearing in mind the terms of their probation, was never explained. Cherry and Mayer were originally contracted at just 10 episodes as stand-ins, still with hope that a settlement might be reached with Wopat and Schneider (in total, they made 19 episodes including one with Bo and Luke). Some scripts for Coy and Vance were originally written for Bo and Luke but with their names quite literally crossed out and Coy and Vance penned in.

The new Dukes—previously unmentioned nephews of Uncle Jesse, who were said to have left the farm in 1976 before the show had started—were unpopular with the great majority of viewers, and the ratings immediately sank. Much of the criticism was that Coy and Vance were nothing but direct clones of Bo and Luke, with Coy a direct "carbon copy" replacement for Bo and Vance for Luke, with little variation in character. This was something that even show creator Gy Waldron has said was wrong, and that he insisted, unsuccessfully, that audiences would not accept direct clones and the two replacements should be taken in a different direction character wise, but was overruled by the producers. Waldron also commented that if Bach too had walked, the show would probably have been canceled. It was reported that prior to filming, Cherry and Mayer were given Bo and Luke episodes to watch, to study and learn to emulate them, although Cherry has said in interviews that he does not recall this ever happening.

Hit hard by the significant drop in ratings, Warner Bros. renegotiated with Wopat and Schneider, and eventually a settlement was reached, and the original Duke boys returned to the series in early 1983, four episodes from the conclusion of the fifth season. Initially, part of the press release announcing Wopat and Schneider's return suggested that Cherry and Mayer would remain as part of the cast (though presumably in a reduced role), but it was quickly realized that "four Duke boys" would not work within the context of the series, and due to the huge unpopularity associated with their time on the show, they were quickly written out of the same episode in which Bo and Luke returned.

Return of Bo and Luke
Although Coy and Vance were never popular, viewers were disappointed by their departure episode, "Welcome Back, Bo 'n' Luke", which was for the most part a standard episode, with the return of Bo and Luke and the departure of Coy and Vance tacked onto the beginning (Bo and Luke return from their NASCAR tour just as Coy and Vance leave Hazzard to tend to a sick relative). More than a few viewers commented that they were disappointed by this, and that they would have liked to see both pairs of Duke boys team up to tackle a particularly dastardly plot by Boss Hogg before Coy and Vance's departure, but as it turned out, Coy and Vance had little dialogue and were gone by the first commercial break, never to be seen, heard from or even mentioned again.

While the return of Bo and Luke was welcomed by ardent and casual viewers alike, and as a result ratings recovered slightly, the show never completely regained its former popularity. One of Wopat and Schneider's disputes even before they left was what they considered to be increasingly weak and formulaic scripts and episode plots. With Wopat and Schneider's return, the producers agreed to try a wider scope of storylines. However, although it continued for two more seasons, the show never fully returned to its former glory. Many cast members, such as Tom Wopat, decried the miniature car effects newly incorporated to depict increasingly absurd General Lee and patrol car stunts (which had previously been performed with real cars by stunt drivers). The miniature car effects were intended as a budget saving measure (to save the cost of repairing or replacing damaged vehicles) and to help compete visually with KITT from the NBC series Knight Rider. In February 1985, The Dukes of Hazzard ended its run after seven seasons.

Vehicles
The show is estimated to have gone through 250–355 cars during filming.

The General Lee (Dodge Charger)

The General Lee was based on a 1969 Dodge Charger owned by Bo and Luke. It was orange with a Confederate battle flag painted on the roof, the words "GENERAL LEE" over each door, and the number "01" on each door. In the original five Georgia-filmed episodes, a Confederate flag along with a checkered racing flag in a criss-cross pattern could be seen behind the rear window; this was removed because the extra decal was impossible to replicate over and over again. The name refers to the American Civil War Confederate General Robert E. Lee. The television show was based on the movie Moonrunners, in turn based on actual moonshine runners who used a 1958 Chrysler named Traveler, after General Lee's horse (with a slight spelling change). Traveler was originally intended to be the name of the Duke boys' stock car too, until producers agreed that General Lee had more punch to it.

Since it was built as a race car, the doors were welded shut. Through the history of the show, an estimated 309 Chargers were used; 17 are still known to exist in various states of repair. A replica was owned by John Schneider, known as "Bo's General Lee". In 2008, Schneider sold "Bo's General Lee" at the Barrett-Jackson automobile auction for $230,000. An eBay auction which garnered a bid of $9,900,500 for the car was never finalized, with the purported bidder claiming his account had been hacked. The underside of the hood has the signatures of the cast from the 1997 TV movie. Schneider has also restored over 20 other General Lees to date. In 2008, a replica of the General Lee fetched a high bid of $450,000 at the Barrett-Jackson auto auction. In 2012, the General Lee 1, the first car used in filming the series, was purchased at auction by golfer Bubba Watson for $110,000. The car had been scrapped after being wrecked during the famous opening jump shoot, and was later discovered in a junkyard by the president of the North American General Lee fan club. In 2015, following a wave of sentiment against Confederate symbolism in the wake of shootings in Charleston, SC (relating to photos where the attacker had posed with the Confederate flag), Bubba Watson announced that he would remove the Confederate Flag from the roof of the General Lee 1 and repaint it with the U.S. National Flag.

The show also used 1968 Chargers (which shared the same sheet metal) by pop-riveting the "I" piece to the center of the 68's grille, as well as cutting out the tail lights, pop-riveting the '69 lenses in place, and removing the round side marker lights. These Chargers performed many record-breaking jumps throughout the show, almost all of them resulting in a completely destroyed car. No 1970 Chargers were used, as backdating them proved to be too time-consuming.

The Duke boys added a custom air horn to the General Lee that played the first 12 notes of the song "Dixie". The Dixie horn was not originally planned, until a Georgia local hot rod racer drove by and sounded his car's Dixie horn. The producers immediately rushed after him asking where he had bought the horn. Warner Bros. purchased several Chargers for stunts, as they generally destroyed at least one or two cars per episode. By the end of the show's sixth season, the Chargers were becoming harder to find and more expensive. In addition, the television series Knight Rider began to rival the General Lees stunts. As such, the producers used 1:8 scale miniatures, filmed by Jack Sessums' crew, or recycled stock jump footage—the latter being a practice that had been in place to an extent since the second season, and had increased as the seasons passed.

Some of the 01 and Confederate flag motifs were initially hand painted, but as production sped up, these were replaced with vinyl decals for quick application (and removal), as needed.

During the first five episodes of the show that were filmed in Georgia, the cars involved with filming were given to the crew at the H&H body shop near the filming location. At this shop, the men worked day and night to prepare the wrecked cars for the next day while still running their body shop during the day. Time was of the essence, and the men that worked at this shop worked hard hours to get the cars prepared for the show.

The third episode "Mary Kaye's Baby" is the only one in which the General Lee does not appear. Instead, the Dukes drove around in a blue 1975 Plymouth Fury borrowed from Cooter that Luke later destroyed by shooting a flaming arrow at the car, whose trunk had been leaking due to the moonshine stowed in the back.

The Duke boys' CB handle was (jointly) "Lost Sheep". Originally when the show was conceived, their handle was to be "General Lee" to match their vehicle, but this was only ever used on-screen on one occasion, in the second episode, "Daisy's Song", when Cooter calls Bo and Luke over the CB by this handle, although they were actually driving Daisy's Plymouth Road Runner (see below) at the time. As it became obvious that the "General Lee" handle would be out of place when the Duke boys were in another vehicle, the "Lost Sheep" handle was devised (with Uncle Jesse being "Shepherd" and Daisy being "Bo Peep").

Hazzard police cars (AMC Matador, Dodge Polara, Dodge Monaco, Plymouth Fury)

The 1975 AMC Matador was one of many Hazzard County police cars used on the series, mostly in the first season; they had light bars and working radios. A 1970 Dodge Polara and a 1974 Dodge Monaco were used during the pilot episode "One Armed Bandits"; these were also seen in the show's title sequence. From the second season, the 1977 Dodge Monaco was mostly used. From mid-season four the similar looking 1978 Plymouth Fury was used instead. The Matadors and Furies were former Los Angeles Police Department vehicles, while the Monacos were former California Highway Patrol units.

Plymouth Road Runner
A 1974 Plymouth Road Runner also referred to as "Old Yeller'''" (yellow with a black stripe) was Daisy Duke's car in the first five episodes of the first season. For the last episodes of the first season a similarly painted 1971 Plymouth Satellite Sebring with a matching "Road Runner" stripe was used. In the second season Bo and Luke send it off a cliff in "The Runaway".  Another identical Plymouth 1971 model car appeared in the background for a few more episodes along with the Jeep CJ-7 until it was finally dropped altogether.

Jeep CJ-7Dixie was the name given to Daisy Duke's white 1980 Jeep CJ-7 "Golden Eagle" which had a golden eagle emblem on the hood and the name "Dixie" on the sides. Like other vehicles in the show, there was actually more than one Jeep used throughout the series. Sometimes it would have an automatic transmission, and other times it would be a manual. The design of the roll cage also varied across the seasons. When the Jeep was introduced at the end of the second season's "The Runaway", it was seen to have doors and a slightly different paint job, but, bar one appearance in the next produced episode, "Arrest Jesse Duke" (actually broadcast before "The Runaway", causing a continuity error), thereafter the doors were removed and the paint job was made all-white, with Dixie painted on the sides of the hood. These Jeeps were leased to the producers of the show by American Motors Corporation in exchange for a brief mention in the closing credits of the show.

Ford F-100 pickup truck
Uncle Jesse's truck was a white Ford pickup truck, most commonly a sixth-generation (1973–1977) F100 Styleside. However, in the earliest episodes it had a Flareside bed, and varied between F100 and F250 models throughout the show's run. Bo, Luke and Daisy also drove Jesse's truck on occasion.

Cadillac De Ville
A white 1970 Cadillac de Ville convertible was used as Boss Hogg's car, notably with large bull horns as a hood ornament. In early seasons, Hogg was almost always driven by a chauffeur, who was normally nameless and had little or no dialogue, but identified on occasion as being called "Alex"; and played by several uncredited actors, including stuntman Gary Baxley. This chauffeur would often be dressed in a red plaid shirt and deep brown or black Stetson hat, but on occasion would be an older man, sometimes dressed in more typical chauffeur attire.

Hogg is first seen to drive for himself in the second-season opener "Days of Shine and Roses", where he and Jesse challenge each other to one last moonshine race. From the fourth season onward, except for a couple of brief reappearances of the chauffeur (during the fourth season), Hogg drove himself around in his Cadillac (or occasionally driven by Rosco and, in the series' finale, by Uncle Jesse) and frequently challenged others by invoking his driving expertise from his days as a ridge-runner. Unlike other vehicles in the series, Boss Hogg's Cadillac is typically treated with kid gloves. The car is almost always seen with its convertible top down, with the top only being seen in two episodes, "Daisy's Song" (the chauffeur was called "Eddie" in this episode), the second to be produced and broadcast, and briefly in the second-season episode "Witness for the Persecution", when Cooter is returning it to the Court House after repairs. When filming close-up shots inside the studio, a similar-looking 1967 De Ville is used. The door vent windows (eliminated for 1969), as well as the small, round, chrome exterior mirror being noticeably different from the 1970 model’s large, square, brushed stainless mirror.

Ford Custom 500
A green and blacked out 1971 Ford Custom 500 sedan named Black Tillie was once used by Uncle Jesse to make moonshine runs. This car was used in "Days of Shine and Roses" (season 2 episode 1). It was not used to make moonshine runs but for a race between Jesse Duke and Boss Hogg, where because of the agreement with the federal government they carried 10 gallons of water to replace the moonshine.

Theme song

The theme song "Good Ol' Boys" was written and performed by Waylon Jennings. He was also "The Balladeer" (as credited), and served as narrator of the show. However, the version released as a single is not the same version that was used in the show's opening credits; the single version has a repeat of the chorus and an instrumental to pad out the length, uses a different instrumental mix that emphasizes the bass, and replaces the last verse with an inside joke about how the TV show producers "keep on showing (Jennings's) hands and not (his) face on TV".

In 1980, the song reached No. 1 on the American Country chart and peaked at No. 21 on the Billboard Hot 100.

Broadcast history

United States
 The series was originally broadcast in America by CBS on Friday nights, at 9:00 p.m. and later 8:00 p.m., preceding Dallas from January 26, 1979, to February 8, 1985.
 Until TNN (The Nashville Network) was purchased by Viacom, it aired reruns of The Dukes of Hazzard. Some months after the creation of "The National Network" (shortly before its change to "Spike TV"), the program was absent from much of television for quite some time. Viacom's country music-themed cable network CMT (the former sister network to TNN) aired the show from 2005 to 2007 at 8:00 p.m. and 9:00 p.m. Eastern Time every weekday. CMT began airing the series in late February 2005. It also aired Monday–Thursday on ABC Family.
CMT aired The Dukes Ride Again, a special marathon which featured episodes from the first two seasons, on the weekend of September 10, 2010, and have begun airing episodes weeknights at 7 p.m. and 11 p.m. Eastern Time starting September 13, 2010.
 CMT began to re-air The Dukes of Hazzard reruns in high definition, on January 5, 2014.
 TV Land began to air The Dukes of Hazzard reruns on June 10, 2015, but removed them just three weeks later as a response to the Charleston church shooting and the ensuing debate over the modern display of the Confederate flag.

Syndication
Soon before the series ended its original run on CBS, The Dukes of Hazzard went into off-network syndication. Although not as widely run as it was back in the 1980s and the years since, reruns of the program do continue to air in various parts of the United States.

Notably, television stations that aired the show in syndication include KCOP Los Angeles, WGN-TV Chicago, KBHK San Francisco, WKBD Detroit, WTAF/WTXF Philadelphia, KTXL Sacramento, WVTV Milwaukee, KMSP Minneapolis–Saint Paul, among others.

Nationwide, the show also aired on ABC Family (2000–01, 2004) and CMT (2005–07, 2010–12, 2014–15) and TV Land (2015); TV Land dropped the show in the wake of protests and controversy surrounding the display of the Confederate flag.

The Nashville Network bought The Dukes of Hazzard from Warner Bros. in 1997 for well over $10 million; not only did it improve the network's ratings, the show was also popular among younger viewers, a demographic TNN had a notorious difficulty in drawing; The Dukes of Hazzard has run either on TNN or sister network CMT ever since.

Nielsen ratings

International
 The series was broadcast by BBC1 in the United Kingdom, debuting on Saturday March 3, 1979 at 9:00 p.m. (just several months after it began in the U.S.). Popular with all ages (and as some of the more adult elements of very early episodes faded out of the series), it quickly moved from its post-watershed position to a more family-friendly Monday evening slot at 7:20 p.m. Soon a massive hit, it moved from Monday evenings to prime-time Saturday evening (times varied, but typically around 5:25 p.m.), where it stayed for a number of years. Later when ratings began to dip (partly caused by the change to Coy and Vance, and partly to do with competition from ITV, with new hit shows such as The A-Team), it moved back to Mondays, making the odd return for short runs on Saturdays. Late episodes also popped up occasionally on Sunday afternoons, and the remaining episodes of the final season were broadcast on weekday mornings during school holidays in the late 1980s.
 In 1992, U.K. satellite channel Sky1 bought a package of the program, owning the rights to the first 60 episodes produced (running up to "The Fugitive"), showing the series on Saturday afternoons at 4 p.m. They later showed the episodes they owned again, including a stint showing it in a weekday 3 p.m. slot, running for 50 minutes (including commercials) with the episodes heavily edited for time as a result, often leaving gaps in the plot. Despite requests from fans, they did not secure the rights to later episodes. The series was later run on the satellite channels Granada Plus and TNT. U.K. satellite channel Bravo began airing reruns in August 2005. Reruns are currently shown on Forces TV.
 In Brazil, the series was named Os Gatões (The Big Hunks), which limited its popularity among the male audience.
 The series was also shown in the Netherlands by Dutch broadcasting organization AVRO, with Dutch subtitles, rather than being dubbed.
 It was shown on Ten Network in Australia from September 1979 until the end of the series, and repeated throughout the 1980s, 1990s and 2000s. It was quietly rerun on pay TV channel TV1 in the 2000s, but is now shown on Nine Network's subchannel, Go!.
 The series aired weekdays on New Zealand's channel The BOX. Previously it aired on TVNZ for its original run, being repeated on Saturday afternoons in the early 1990s. In May 1984, a doctor and member of the Auckland Health Board called for the programme to be taken off-air for promoting reckless driving; the production of the story for the Network News was featured in the 1985 documentary Network New Zealand.
 The series was popular in Colombia, dubbed into Spanish. Some late-night reruns continue to the present day.
 In Italy, the series started to air in September 1981 on Canale 5, under the title Hazzard and quickly became popular with the viewers.

Spin-offs
 A spin-off named Enos, starring Sonny Shroyer, aired on CBS from November 1980 to May 1981 and lasted a total of 18 episodes before being canceled.
 An animated version of the show called The Dukes aired in 1983 and was produced by Hanna-Barbera. The first season fell under the Coy and Vance era of the live-action show and thus they were adapted into animated form. By the second season, Bo and Luke had returned, and they replaced Coy and Vance in the cartoon.
 Several video games based on the show were created:
 The Dukes of Hazzard for ColecoVision (1984) and ZX Spectrum (1985); also planned for the Atari 2600
 The Dukes of Hazzard: Racing for Home (1999)
 The Dukes of Hazzard II: Daisy Dukes It Out (2000)
 The Dukes of Hazzard: Return of the General Lee (2004)
 In 2005, the Humana Festival of New American Plays premiered a full-length comedy drama entitled Hazzard County by Allison Moore. The story centers on a young widowed mother and a visit she receives from a big city television producer. Interspersed with recollections of Bo, Luke, and Daisy, the play takes a deep look at southern "good ol' boy" culture and its popularization through the lens of American mass media.
 In 2014, AutoTrader made a commercial where Bo and Luke shop for a new car while being chased.

TV movies
Two made-for-TV reunion movies aired on CBS, The Dukes of Hazzard: Reunion! (1997) and The Dukes of Hazzard: Hazzard in Hollywood (2000).

Films
The film The Dukes of Hazzard was released in 2005, and a direct-to-video prequel The Dukes of Hazzard: The Beginning in 2007. These films were more buddy comedy road film in tone than the original TV series, which was an action-comedy.

Home media

DVD
Warner Home Video has released all seven seasons of The Dukes of Hazzard on DVD in Regions 1 and 2. The two TV movies that followed the series were released on DVD in Region 1 on June 10, 2008, and in Region 4 on June 4, 2014. In Region 4, Warner has released only the first six seasons on DVD and the two TV movies. The Complete Series and Two Unrated Feature Films Box Set was released on DVD in Region 1 on November 14, 2017.

Streaming
The TV series was also made available for streaming and download through a variety of services.

Reception

Season 1 garnered a mixed reception from critics. Tom Shales (The Washington Post): "Within five minutes, the program is out of breath from pandering so pantingly to its audience. [...] If this show succeeds, every television critic in America may as well quit." Peter Hartlaub, writing for the San Francisco Chronicle: "Unfortunately, the first Dukes season wasn't the best, with a low budget and characters who found their footing as the series continued (Cooter started out a numbskull type)." Conversely, Danny Graydon (Empire) writes: "Today, Hazzards considerable charm endures, even if the sheer predictability is wearing."

Legacy and influence in popular culture
In 2005, Tom Wopat and John Schneider were reunited during "Exposed", a fifth-season episode of the television series Smallville. Wopat guest-starred as Kansas State Senator Jack Jennings, an old friend of Clark Kent's adoptive father Jonathan Kent (portrayed by Schneider). In the episode, Jennings drives a 1968 Dodge Charger—the same body style as the General Lee.

Daisy Duke was almost always dressed in very short high waist jean shorts. That style of shorts became known as "Daisy Dukes". The “Daisy Dukes” referenced in the Katy Perry’s number one single “California Gurls”.

The series is referenced in the British sitcom Only Fools and Horses; it is one of Grandad's favourite television programmes.Lizard Lick Towing featured an episode with its repossession specialists Ronnie Shirley and Bobby Brantley repossessing a General Lee replica.

 Confederate flag controversy 
After the 2015 Charleston church shooting, renewed debate about the symbolism of the Confederate battle flag (which was prominently featured on the General Lees roof, and the panel behind the rear window in the first five episodes) prompted TV Land to pull reruns of the original series. Warner Bros., which owns the property, announced it would also no longer create merchandise bearing the flag, including miniatures of the General Lee. During the 2020 George Floyd protests, Amazon reportedly considered removing the program from its streaming service.

Tourist attraction

Artifacts from the show are on display in Luray, Virginia; Nashville, Tennessee; and Pigeon Forge, Tennessee. Cooter's Place in Luray is overseen by Ben "Cooter" Jones from the series. The Pigeon Forge location features a gift shop and a small display of costumes, collectibles and artifacts from the show.

Covington and Conyers, Georgia, where the original five episodes were produced and filmed, have been two major tourist attractions for Dukes of Hazzard fans.

See also

References

Further reading
 Redneck Boy in the Promised Land: The Confessions of "Crazy Cooter"'', by Ben "Cooter" Jones, 2008. Crown.

External links

 The Dukes of Hazzard official Facebook page
 
 The Dukes of Hazzard at CMT
 Who sang the theme song and also served as the narrator on The Dukes of Hazzard? 

 
1970s American comedy-drama television series
1979 American television series debuts
1980s American comedy-drama television series
1985 American television series endings
American action adventure television series
American action comedy television series
American action television series
American adventure television series
Appalachia in fiction
CBS original programming
English-language television shows
Fictional duos
Self-censorship
Television duos
Television series about cousins
Television series about families
Television series by Warner Bros. Television Studios
Television shows adapted into films
Television shows adapted into video games
Television shows filmed in Georgia (U.S. state)
Television shows filmed in Santa Clarita, California
Television shows set in Georgia (U.S. state)